Mount Semprebon is a prominent, partly snow-free peak rising 1 nautical mile (1.9 km) northeast of Mount Barsoum in Martin Hills. The peak was positioned by the U.S. Ellworth-Byrd Traverse Party on December 10, 1958, and named for Louis C. Semprebon, an ionospheric physicist and assistant scientific leader at Ellsworth Station in 1958.

Mountains of Ellsworth Land